The Silent Battle is a 1916 American silent drama film directed by Jack Conway and starring J. Warren Kerrigan, Lois Wilson and Maude George.

Cast
 J. Warren Kerrigan as Tom Gallatin 
 Lois Wilson as Jane Loring 
 Maude George as Nina Jaffray 
 Harry Carter as Coleman Van Duyn 
 Ray Hanford as John Kenyon 
 Jack Connolly as James Loring

References

Bibliography
 Langman, Larry. American Film Cycles: The Silent Era. Greenwood Publishing, 1998.

External links
 

1916 films
1916 drama films
1910s English-language films
American silent feature films
Silent American drama films
Films directed by Jack Conway
American black-and-white films
Universal Pictures films
1910s American films